This article stated the results of the World Soling Championships from 1990 till 1994. Unfortunitely not all crew names are documented in the major sources: United States Soling Association (USSA) bulletin "Leading Edge" and International Soling Association (ISA) magazine "Soling Sailing".

1990 Final results 

 1990 Progress

Further results
For further results see:
 Soling World Championship results (1969–1979)
 Soling World Championship results (1980–1984)
 Soling World Championship results (1985–1989)
 Soling World Championship results (1990–1994)
 Soling World Championship results (1995–1999)
 Soling World Championship results (2000–2004)
 Soling World Championship results (2005–2009)
 Soling World Championship results (2010–2014)
 Soling World Championship results (2015–2019)

References

Soling World Championships